Patrick Denard Douthit (born January 15, 1975), better known as 9th Wonder, is a hip hop record producer, record executive, DJ, and rapper from North Carolina. He began his career as the main producer for the group Little Brother in Durham, North Carolina, and has also worked with Jean Grae, Wale, Murs, Buckshot, Erykah Badu, David Banner, Rapsody, and Talib Kweli. As of 2010, 9th Wonder raps under the name of 9thmatic. 9th Wonder's production often builds on samples from artists such as Al Green and Curtis Mayfield.

Music career 
9th Wonder's first significant career breakthrough came in 2003 when, as an up-and-coming producer, he released an unofficial remix album of Nas' 2002 album God's Son entitled God's Stepson. Released through internet outlets, the album garnered significant attention and acclaim. The producer has said that he was not thinking in terms of using it to generate a buzz or promote his skills at that point: "I never thought any of this of me as a producer was going to happen." The album has since been credited as starting the now regular trend for unofficial 'home-made' remixes of whole albums.

9th Wonder began his career as the main producer for the group Little Brother. As part of Little Brother he gained recognition and critical acclaim for his production on their debut 2003 release, The Listening. Jay-Z's studio engineer Young Guru was impressed with his work, and contacted 9th Wonder, which led to 9th Wonder producing "Threat" for Jay-Z's 2003 The Black Album. The cut proved to be a mainstream breakthrough for 9th Wonder, most immediately in the major production role he secured on Destiny's Child's 2004 Destiny Fulfilled album that Jay-Z was instrumental in helping bring about. On the album, 9th Wonder produced the tracks "Girl" and "Is She the Reason", plus the bonus track "Game Over".

9th Wonder left Little Brother in 2007.

Recent and current projects 
In August 2010, Drake exchanged tweets with 9th Wonder on Twitter, expressing his desire to work with him again (the first time being the production of "Think Good Thoughts" featuring Phonte and Elzhi for his 2007 mixtape Comeback Season). It was revealed in October 2010 that 9th Wonder would be producing for Drake on his second album, Take Care, which was released on November 15, 2011. However, a month prior to the release, 9th Wonder said in an interview that he would not appear on Take Care due to A&R issues.

Singer Chris Brown recorded a series of rap freestyles over 9th Wonder beats. The first was released on July 18, 2011, on YouTube under the title "Real Hip Hop #3". This was followed a day later by "Real Hip Hop #4" featuring Kevin McCall. These tracks were included in Brown's rap mixtape Boy in Detention, released on August 5, 2011.

On June 25, 2020, 9th Wonder, Terrace Martin, Kamasi Washington, and Robert Glasper announced the formation of a supergroup, Dinner Party. They released a single, "Freeze Tag". Their debut album was released on July 10, 2020.

Hip hop professor and academia 
2007 saw a sideline move into music academia for 9th Wonder when he, along with Christopher "Play" Martin from hip hop group Kid-n-Play, was appointed Artist-In-Residence by the Chancellor of North Carolina Central University, and began instructing a hip hop history class in NCCU's Music Dept.

His role as a music professor has proven an ongoing one as in January 2010 it was announced that 9th Wonder would co-teach a class titled "Sampling Soul" with Dr. Mark Anthony Neal at Duke University. In an interview with HitQuarters, he explained the reason for the move into academia: "Educating the youth on where hip-hop comes from and the history of it, using the records we use, gives hip-hop a longer life. I decided to become an advocate of that." 9th Wonder also recently took on a course titled "Intro to Hip Hop Production".

In May 2021, Douthit joined the Faculty at Roc Nation School of Music, Sports & Entertainment at Long Island University as a visiting professor. His courses include the history of hip hop and The Making of an Album.

Discography

Solo albums 
 2005: Dream Merchant Vol. 1
 2007: Dream Merchant Vol. 2
 2011: The Wonder Years
 2012: Tutankhamen (Valley of the Kings)
 2013: Bladey Mae (Grandma's Blades)
 2016: Zion
 2017: Zion II
 2018: Zion III
 2019: Zion IV
 2020: Zion V: The Ballad of Charles Douthit
 2021: Zion VI: Shooting In The Gym
 2022: Zion VII

Group albums 
 2003: The Listening (with Phonte and Rapper Big Pooh as Little Brother)
 2005: The Minstrel Show (with Phonte and Rapper Big Pooh as Little Brother)

Collaborative albums 
 2003: Shake N Beats (Instrumental LP) (with Spectac)
 2003: Legsclusives (with L.E.G.A.C.Y.)
 2004: Murs 3:16: The 9th Edition (with Murs)
 2005: Chemistry (with Buckshot)
 2005: Spirit of '94: Version 9.0 (with Kaze)
 2005: 9th Gate (with Access Immortal)
 2006: Murray's Revenge (with Murs)
 2006: Cloud 9: The 3 Day High (with Skyzoo)
 2007: Class is in Session (with Pete Rock)
 2008: The Formula (with Buckshot)
 2008: Jeanius (with Jean Grae)
 2008: Sweet Lord (with Murs)
 2008: The Corner of Spec & 9th (with Spectac)
 2010: Fornever (with Murs)
 2010: Death of a Pop Star (with David Banner)
 2012: The Solution (with Buckshot)
 2012: The Final Adventure (with Murs)
 2013: Where Do I Come From? (with Explicit)
 2015: Indie 500 (with Talib Kweli)
 2015: Brighter Daze (with Murs)
 2017: The Lost Tapes – EP (with Mr. Cheeks)
 2019: The Iliad Is Dead And The Odyssey Is Over (with Murs)
 2020: Dinner Party (with Robert Glasper, Terrace Martin, Kamasi Washington)
 2022: The Don & Eye (with The Musalini)

Collaborative mixtapes 
 2006: Battle of the Beats Round 1–2 (with The Alchemist & DJ E.Nyce)
 2007: 9th Year Freshman (with CHOPS)
 2007: The Graduate (with Kanye West, Mick Boogie & Terry Urban)
 2008: The W.ide W.Orld of W.Rap (with E.Ness)
 2008: Album Mixtape Volume One (with Cans)
 2008: 9 Wonders (NYOIL verses 9th Wonder) (with NYOIL)
 2009: The R&B Sensation Mixtape (with Tyler Woods)
 2009: Back to the Feature (with Wale & LRG)
 2009: The Hardy Boy Mystery Mixtape: Curse of Thee Green Faceded (with Thee Tom Hardy & Don Cannon)
 2010: To Hanes Mall (with Akello Light)
 2010: Album Mixtape Part 2 (with Cans)
 2010: The (Free) EP (with Actual Proof)
 2011: TP Is My Hero (with TP)
 2012: Hanes Mall 2: Silas Creek Parkway EP (with Akello Light)

Compilation and remix albums 
 2003: 9th Invented the Remix
 2003: God's Stepson – Nas (Remix of Nas's God's Son)
 2004: Black Is Back! – Jay-Z (Remix of Jay-Z's The Black Album)
 2005: The Remix EP (Remixed Songs of Smif-N-Wessun)
 2009: Wonder Years – 9th Wonder Golden Years Remix LP
 2010: 9th's Opus: It's a Wonderful World Music Group Vol.1
 2010: 9th Invented the Remix...Again
 2010: Loose Joints
 2010: Food for Thought
 2012: Tutankhamen
 2013: Black American Gangster – Jay-Z (Remix of Jay-Z's American Gangster)
 2014: 9th Wonder Presents: Jamla Is the Squad 
 2018: 9th Wonder Presents: Jamla Is the Squad II

References

External links 

American hip hop record producers
African-American male rappers
American male rappers
Southern hip hop musicians
North Carolina Central University alumni
Rappers from North Carolina
Musicians from Durham, North Carolina
Musicians from Winston-Salem, North Carolina
1975 births
Living people
Atlantic Records artists
African-American record producers
American hip hop DJs
20th-century American rappers
21st-century American rappers
20th-century American male musicians
21st-century American male musicians
20th-century African-American musicians
21st-century African-American musicians
FL Studio users